Blackstar were a British hard rock band, formed as a retooling of the band Carcass in 1995 without Bill Steer along with former Cathedral guitarist Mark Griffiths. The band name comes from a Carcass song off the Swansong 1996 album. 
Blackstar released only a single album.
After a while, the band was forced to change its name to Blackstar Rising. The band dissolved because drummer Ken Owen suffered from a brain haemorrhage.

Members 

Jeff Walker - bass, vocals
Carlos Regadas - lead guitar
Ken Owen - drums
Mark Griffiths - rhythm guitar

Discography

Promo 96
 Revolution of the Heart
 New Song
 Rock 'n' Roll Circus
 Don't Want to Talk Anymore
 Better the Devil
 Waste of Space
 Instrumental

Barbed Wire Soul (1997 Peaceville Records)
Japanese versions has 5 demo tracks and 3 cover versions as bonus tracks

 Game Over 4:02
 Smile 3:37
 Sound of Silence 3:44
 Rock 'n' Roll Circus 4:14
 New Song 3:54
 Give Up the Ghost 3:07
 Revolution of the Heart 4:02
 Waste of Space 3:50
 Deep Wound 3:09
 Better the Devil 4:40
 Instrumental 5:00
(The end of the song Instrumental is a quote from the movie From Dusk Till Dawn)

X (1998 CD VILE77)
Digipack 10 year anniversary release with cover tracks by Peaceville artists X cover 	

 Anathema - "One Of The Few" (Pink Floyd)
 Dominion - "Shout" (Tears For Fears)
 My Dying Bride - "Some Velvet Morning" (Nancy Sinatra/Lee Hazlewood)
 My Dying Bride - "Roads" (Portishead)
 Anathema - "Better Off Dead" (Bad Religion)
 Thine - "Song Of Joy" (Nick Cave)
 Blackstar - "The Girl Who Lives On Heaven Hill" (Hüsker Dü)
 Acrimony - "O Baby" (Status Quo)
 The Blood Divine - "Crazy Horses" (The Osmonds)
 The Blood Divine - "Love Will Tear Us Apart" (Joy Division)
 Dominion - "Paint It Black" (Rolling Stones)
 Blackstar - "Running Back" (Thin Lizzy)
 Lid - "Don't Let Me Down" (The Beatles)
 Anathema - "Goodbye Cruel World" (Pink Floyd)

External links

Musical groups established in 1997
Musical groups disestablished in 1998
Musical quartets
English heavy metal musical groups